Mesoleuca albicillata, the beautiful carpet, is a moth of the family Geometridae. It is found in the Palearctic.

Distribution
From Spain through Western and Central Europe including the British Isles through to the temperate zone in Central Asia. In the North of Europe it is found up to  Central Fennoscandia, in the South to Italy to the Balkans and the Black Sea.

Description
The wingspan is 34–38 mm. The ground colour of the forewings is creamy white to bright white. The basal field is markedly black-brown in colour. There is a large black-brown on the front edge behind the middle and almost to the apex. There is a  double crossline of dark grey colour and a white wavy line in the grey marginal field, Very small black discal flecks are also present. The hindwings are white, have a grey marginal field that is crossed by a faint whitish squiggle and there is a thin, dark cross line and a small black middle spot.Adult caterpillars are strongly coloured green. On the dorsum they show very distinctive yellow-brown to red-brown arrow spots.

Biology
The moth is single brooded and flies from mid May to mid August.

The larva feeds on bramble, raspberry and strawberry and in the UK can be found from July to September.

The species inhabits open forests, forest edges, wetlands, shore areas as well as gardens and parks

Similar species
Catarhoe cuculata with a wingspan of 22 to 27 millimeters is significantly smaller and also shows reddish-brown marks in the basal and marginal fields. In  Melanthia procellata the dark basal field is smaller, the costal edge shows a narrow stripe and the large dark discal spot is extended further than in albicillata.

Notes
The flight season refers to Belgium and The Netherlands. This may vary in other parts of the range.

References

External links

 Beautiful carpet at UKmoths
Lepiforum.de
Vlindernet.nl 

Larentiini
Moths described in 1758
Moths of Asia
Moths of Europe
Moths of Japan
Taxa named by Carl Linnaeus